Cassida margaritacea is a species of beetle belonging to the family Chrysomelidae.

It is native to Europe.

References

Cassidinae